Sarah Furman Warner Williams (1764 — 1848) was an American embroiderer and quiltmaker. Her coverlet, which she made in 1803 to honor the marriage of her 17-year old cousin Phebe Berrien Warner to Henry Cotheal, is included in the collection of the Metropolitan Museum of Art. Needlework pieces by Williams are in the collection of the Winterthur Museum, Garden and Library.

Gallery

References

1764 births
1848 deaths
18th-century American women artists
19th-century American women artists
18th-century American artists
19th-century American artists